"The Dungeon" was an American television film broadcast on April 17, 1958, as part of the second season of the CBS television series Playhouse 90. David Swift wrote the teleplay and directed. Paul Douglas, Agnes Moorehead, and Dennis Weaver starred.

Plot
Karl Ohringer is acquitted of murder on grounds that the killing was not intentional. A wealthy and eccentric man, Emery Ganun, decides to take justice into his own hands.

Cast
The following performers received screen credit for their performances:

 Paul Douglas - Emery Ganun
 Agnes Moorehead - Rose Ganun
 Dennis Weaver - Karl Ohringer
 Julie Adams - Janice Ohringer
 Patty McCormack - Mahala May
 Thomas Gomez - John Marin
 Ian Wolfe - Eduard Wingate
 Patrick McVey - Lt. Galiffa
 Werner Klemperer - Jesse Eastland
 Russell Collins - Walter Hinch
 Eduard Franz - Burton Wheless
 Ken Lynch
 Johnny Crawford
 Mimi Gibson
 Robert Osterloh
 Philip Tonge

References

1958 television plays
1958 American television episodes
Playhouse 90 (season 2) episodes